The 2017-18 Maltese Futsal Premier League is the 8th season of the Maltese Gatorade League, the top Maltese league for futsal clubs, since its establishment in 2011. It is also 19th season of the futsal championship in Malta, since the beginning of organized futsal in the country in 1999.

Regular season

Elite Group

Division One

Division One Playoffs

Elite First Place Decider

After regular 11 rounds, Valletta fished at first place with the same number of points as Luxol,  but with a better goal score. The first place was determined after the first place decider held on February 27, 2018. Luxol won 2-1 with Mark Zammit and Giancarlo Sammut among the scorers. Shawn Vella scored the only goal for Valletta.

Playoffs

The 2018 Maltese Futsal Premier League Playoffs began on March 2, 2018. The season ended on March 23, 2018, with the final between two regular stage best teams, Luxol and Valletta.

References

Futsal in Malta
Malta
2017–18 in Maltese football